is a Japanese footballer currently playing as a forward for Machida Zelvia as a designated special player.

Career statistics

Club
.

Notes

References

External links

1999 births
Living people
People from Ebetsu, Hokkaido
Association football people from Hokkaido
Hosei University alumni
Japanese footballers
Association football forwards
J2 League players
FC Machida Zelvia players